Neodymium(III) hydride is an inorganic compound composed of neodymium and hydrogen with a chemical formula NdH3. It is considered as the most common hydride of neodymium. In this compound, the neodymium atom is in the +3 oxidation state and the hydrogen atoms are -1. It is highly reactive.

Properties

Neodymium hydride is a blue crystal of the hexagonal system, with unit cell parameters a=0.385 nm, c=0.688 nm.

It reacts with water to form neodymium hydroxide and hydrogen gas:

NdH3 + 3 H2O → Nd(OH)3 + 3 H2

Production
Neodymium(III) hydride can be produced by directly reacting neodymium and hydrogen gas:
 2Nd + 3H2 → 2NdH3

It can also be made by hydrogenerating neodymium(II) hydride.

See also
 Neodymium
 Hydrogen
 Lanthanide

References

neodymium compounds
Metal hydrides